Manjusha Kanwar (born 20 March 1971, née Manjusha Pavangadkar) is a female badminton player. She was born in Pune, Maharashtra, India. Presently works as Deputy General Manager in Sports Department Indian Oil Corporation, New Delhi. She was  part of Indian Badminton League in 2018–20 as a Coach of Delhi Team. She was honored with the FICCI Life Time Achievement Award in 2020 for her achievements both as a player and her work for the promotion of sports.

Career 
Manjusha Kanwar won the National Championships in India for the first time in 1991. Nine more titles followed until 2002. Bronze Medalist in Commonwealth Games in 1998 (Teams) wherein she played both singles and doubles.  Gold Medalist in South Asian Games 2004 in teams and Silver Medalist in Women's Doubles  and Mixed Doubles. She represented India for 12 years.

Achievements

South Asian Games

IBF International

References

External links
 

Indian female badminton players
Indian national badminton champions
Living people
1971 births
Racket sportspeople from Pune
Sportswomen from Maharashtra
Commonwealth Games medallists in badminton
Commonwealth Games bronze medallists for India
20th-century Indian women
20th-century Indian people
Badminton players at the 1998 Commonwealth Games
South Asian Games gold medalists for India
South Asian Games silver medalists for India
South Asian Games medalists in badminton
Medallists at the 1998 Commonwealth Games